Erna Petermann (born 1912, date of death unknown) was a high-ranking female overseer at two Nazi concentration camps during the closing months of World War II.

Biography
Little is known about Erna Petermann, other than that she trained at the men's camp at Mittelbau-Dora sometime in 1944. The Schutzstaffel (SS) promoted Petermann to the rank of Lagerführerin (Female Camp Commandant) under a male commandant. Later, Petermann was transferred as Female Camp Commandant to the Großwerther subcamp in the Harz Mountains.

Disappearance
When Großwerther was liberated by the Allies, Petermann fled the camp and went into hiding. Her whereabouts were not discovered and therefore it was not possible to question her regarding possible involvement with war crimes. Her subsequent history and post-war activities remain unknown.

See also 
List of people who disappeared

References
Daniel Patrick Brown, The Camp Women: The Female Auxiliaries Who Assisted the SS in Running the Nazi Concentration Camp System, Schiffer Publishing, 2002, 

1912 births
Year of death missing
1940s missing person cases
Female guards in Nazi concentration camps
Missing people
Missing person cases in Germany
Mittelbau-Dora concentration camp personnel